Vajiravudh College is a private all-boys boarding school located at 197 Rajvithi Road, Dusit, Bangkok 10300 Thailand. The school was established by Phra Mongkut Klao Chaoyuhua - King Rama VI who is also known as King Vajiravudh. It was originally named the Royal Pages College (in Thai: Ma-had-lek-luang) then the king shifted Thai King College students to Royal Pages College and rename it as Vajiravudh College. 
In the college, the students are accommodated in houses (Ka-na) which are generally in primary and secondary education houses. The primary students stay in 3 houses called Sanamchan, Nandhauthayan, and Saranrom. The secondary students are divided into 6 houses called School House, Dusit House, Chitlada House, Phyathai House, Chongruk-Bhakdi House, and Saksri-Mongkol House. Overall, the college supports students to balance sports and music or arts activities with academic education. 
Normally, boys enter the school at Prathom 4 (Year 5) and stay on until they finish high school - Mathayom 6 (Year 13).

Royal Policy

The royal policy of His Majesty King Rama VI, the founder, was
"In the Royal Pages Colleges, what I want is not so much to turn out model boys, all of the same Standard, all brilliant “Madhayom” Scholars with thousands of marks each, as to turn out efficient young men, young men who will be physically and morally clean, and who will be looking forward keenly to take up whatever burden the future may lay upon them. I do not want a monument of learning who have passed all your exams with flying colours. I do not want a walking school book. What I want are just manly young men, honest, truthful, clean in habit and thoughts; and I would not break my heart about

it if you told me that such or such a fellow writes with difficulty, can't do compound fraction, or does not know any geometry if I only knew that he has learned enough at my school to know the difference between true manliness and effeminacy. I never want again to hear “clever” people complaining that "ปัญญาท่วมหัวเอาตัวไม่รอด".

At the Mahadlek College, what I want is that Education should mean the turning of a boy into a fine young man and a good citizen, not to crush out all individuality under the weight of Syllabus and System! and I want Education to be interesting to the boys so that they would in later days be able to look back upon School life as something peculiarly pleasant to have passed through. My College is not to be compared to other schools, where the aim is different. If I had wanted just the ordinary kind of school, I would have founded a day school, not a boarding one."

History

The school was founded on 29 December 1910 to provide education but also as a "reign monastery". Normally, the King would build a temple as his reign monastery, but because as there were already many temples the King decided to build a school instead based on the system of Public School in England.

In establishing, His Majesty donated his wealth to build a temporarily wooden study building on his land at Suan Krajung near Khlong Prem Prachakon at Dusit district. Then moved in the Royal Pages's students which were temporarily located near Brahman ceremony hall in Royal Palace on 11 June 1911. Then later in 1915, His Majesty donated his wealth to build a permanent Royal Pages's study building, which was composed of an assembly hall and four houses at the four corners of the school. Then His Majesty set the first stone on 20 December 1915, then in 1916 Ratchavittayaluy from the Ministry of Justice was moved onto his caring. His Majesty also established Chiang Mai Royal Pages College at Chiang Mai in 1917. Now the college in Chiang Mai is known as Yupparaj Royal's College.

The expansion of this school was stopped by the heavenly rest of Phra Mongkut Klao Chaoyuhua King Rama VI on 25 November 1925. In the next reign Siam (the name of Thailand at that time,) was having economic problems, caused Phra Pokklao Chaoyuhua Rama VII to cut His Majesty's expenses. To keep the country's money in balance, His Majesty decided to close Royal Pages College and King's College (in Thai Ra-ja-vi-ta-ya-lai) and merge them all with  Royal Pages College in Bangkok in 1926. Then His Majesty gave the school a new name, Vajiravudh College, in the honor of Phra Mongkut Klao Chaoyuhua, King Rama VI or King Vajiravudh.

Admissions

Vajiravudh College is a leading boarding school in Thailand that would provide general education from primary to secondary level, including moral training in the style of British public schools. A board of directors was founded to manage the school, and this tradition continues to the present day.

The all-boys boarding is also exclusive for boys. Here, the school introduces more discipline something like military boarding style so that they can really change themselves to become responsible citizens in the future. The school provides students with high standards of academic instruction, opportunities for service to others, and a well-rounded program of activities directed toward the development of their skills, talents, and self-confidence for lifelong learning. Its facilities provide students with ample scope for supervised leisure and sport as well as studies. The school prepares students to become leaders in meeting the ever-changing needs of the world and equips them with the knowledge to face challenges in a cross-cultural environment.

Boarding life

School houses

Students normally stay in the school for 12 days and back to the parents for 2 days. There are 9 boarding houses in the school (Ka-na) and separated into the senior and junior houses. There are 6 senior houses that each house is accommodated about 80 students and equally divided for each grade from year 8 to year 13 and 3 junior houses that are accommodated around 40 students from year 5 to year 7. Most of them were named after the royal palaces in Thailand, where King Rama VI used to stay. Every boarding house has its own house color as a symbol.

Senior houses:
The regularity in senior houses mainly is arranged by prefects that given authorities by the Headmaster and Head of house. The system is described as "good leadership come from good flower experiences".

The Headmaster's House, Light blue
Dusit House, Dark blue
Chitlada House, Dark green
Phyathai House, Pink
Chongruk-Bhakdi House, Light green
Saksri-Mongkol House, Red

Junior houses:
The regularity in junior houses is different from senior houses that authorities are given to the head of house and teachers.

Sanamchan House, Yellow
Nandhauthayan House, Purple
Saranrom House, Gray

Time schedule
6.00 am Wake up and preparation for class
7.00 – 7.50 am	Study first period
8.00 am	Breakfast
8.30 am	Assemble and pray
9.00 am	 Study from the second period to the sixth period
13.30 am Lunch 
14.00-15.00 am Music or arts activities
16.00-17.30 am Sports
17.30 am Preparation for dinner
18.15 am Dinner
19.00 - 20.45 am PREP: Study and do homework
20.45-21.00 am	Preparation for bedtime
21.00 am pray
21.30 am Bedtime for junior students
22.00 am Bedtime for senior students

Sports
All Vajiravudh students are required to do some kinds of sports every day from 4:00 p.m. to 5:30 p.m. according to the schedule. In each semester there are competitions between houses.

First semester, Rainy season (Visakha), there are badminton and rugby competitions.

Second semester, Winter Season (Pavarana), there are basketball, football and swimming competitions.

Third semester, Summer season (Makha), there are tennis, athletics, fives  and squash competitions.

The school's main sport is rugby, which is dominant in Thai's under-15, under-17, and under-19 rugby tournaments for years. The reason that rugby becomes the school's main sport is that Phra Mongkut Klao Chaoyuhua King Rama VI thought that rugby would teach men sportsmanship, would teach them how to be a gentleman as rugby is described by the English as "Sport played in heaven". A traditional friendly fixture against Malay College Kuala Kangsar of Malaysia is held annually since 1960. The rugby boys of Vajiravudh have dominated the yearly test matches, with their Malaysian counterparts only winning years were in 1963, 1999, 2013, and 2017. Essentially it is an Under-17 boy of MCKK up against the Under-19 boys, over the years being conducted to be in favor of the school.

School traditions

Uniform

Each time school hosts a traditional ceremony or going to a ceremony all students will have to dress in the uniform given by King Vajiravudh. The purpose of King Vajiravudh for having the uniform is for the students to dress

1. White overcoat suit with covers for two upper pockets and two lower pockets on each side. With five silver Phra Mongut buttons.

2. Dark blue velvet shirt collar with a one centimetre wide silver stripe.

3. Dark blue shorts covering half of the knees.

4. Dark blue triangle cap with two silver buttons.

5. Long black socks reaching the knees, with black leather shoes.

Songs
Each of the school's songs would be sung at an important ceremony.

Maha Vajiravudh Rajsadudee "Praise the Great Vajiravudh" written by Madam Dusadee Malakul Na Ayuthaya, rhythm Chaloke Netre-suit. This song would be sung for praising the greatness of King Vajiravudh the school's founder.

Rao dek nai luang "We Royal Page" is a song written by King Vajiravudh. The words are to remind students of the importance of being royal page students. The song is sung in old Thai style melody and played by Thai traditional musical instruments.

Eek see sip pe "Forty Years On" is the song adapted from the song Forty Years On of Harrow School. Changing its words to fit into the school by Madam Dusadee Malakul Na Ayuthaya. The song is to remind the old boys and the current students about life in school days.

Graduates Song Goodbye is an English song word and melody by F.Rico. The song is sung by the graduating students, the song is to think about the student's future life after graduation. Jan ya nak kee la "Sportsmanship" is the song sung before each of the competitions between houses. The song is to remind the students of sportsmanship. The rhythm of the song is in old Thai rhythm.

Buildings

Buildings in the school are mainly Thai style constructed e.g. Assembly hall, Clock Tower, Vajiramongkut (also called the White Building), and the houses. Phachatipok building is a sciences and mathematics education building. Bejaratana building was the science center but now it uses for language classes. The Kongbangkabkarn building is for computer science and foreign languages center; Vajiramongkud is for Thai language and social science; Vejsukamsatid is for arts. Suwattana is for music center and mathematic classes. Humanity and information resource center is for Recreation. There are a new gymnasium and music buildings.

School's headmasters
The headmaster is given the authority in the name of King to manage and lead the school accordingly to the royal policy. Unlike other schools, the College's headmaster is called "ผู้บังคับการ" (Commanding Officer; equivalent to that of a military Regiment commander).

 1909 - 1911 Phra Ohwadworakit (Hem Ponpantakit)
 1911 - 1917 Phra Abhirakrajharit or Phraya Bariharachamanop (Sorn Sornkate)
 1917 - 1926 Phraya Barombathbamrung (Pin Sriwattana)
 1926 - 1933 Phrya Prichanusat       (Serm Panyarachun)
 1933 - 1935 Phraya Barombathbamrung (Pin Sriwattana)
 1935 - 1942 Phra Nichayasarnvithet (Path Montataththuplern)
 1942 - 1975 Phraya Baratraja      (M.L. Dosatith Isarasena)
 1976 - 1995 Prof. Dr. Gal Isarasena Na Ayutthaya
 1995 - 2007 Prof. Dr. Chaianan Samutvanijja
 2007 – 2016     Dr. Saroj Leesavan
 2016 – 2021 Assistant Prof. Suravudh  
 2021 - Present Kiattikhun Chartprasert

Global collaboration
Vajiravudh College has established the Global Collaboration and International Programs with over 20 schools from countries, including United States, England, New Zealand, Australia, Malaysia, India, and Singapore.

A variety of international programs were developed, including international school cooperation and academic exchange, foreign teacher employment, school joint cooperation, teaching staff going abroad, and other international cooperation matters. Collaboration with other international schools benefits by increasing the opportunities available to students and teachers, as well as building strong foundations for dealing with academic collaboration and cultural exchange programs.

Vajiravudh College centennial
Message from the headmaster, Dr. Saroj Leesavan, "The 100th year anniversary of the foundation of the school is held from 29 December 2010. Since the school was named as ‘Royal Pages College’ that was the beginning of the Royal policy and the modern education system from King Rama VI that will lead the country to better development. The education creates a ‘young gentlemen who will be physically and morally clean’ who will help the country and society. After 100 years, the direction from the King still stay in the student's heart and many graduated students are admitted and respected to work in an important role especially working in the name of King Rama IX which maintain the purpose of the school."

External links
 http://www.vajiravudh.ac.th
 http://www.oldvajiravudh.com
 http://www.vajiravudhcollege.com
 http://www.vajiravudh100.com

References 

Boys' schools in Thailand
Educational institutions established in 1910
Dusit district
Schools in Bangkok
Boarding schools in Thailand
1910 establishments in Siam
Unregistered ancient monuments in Bangkok